Pârâul Boului may refer to the following rivers in Romania:

 Pârâul Boului (Moldovița), a tributary of the Moldovița in Suceava County
 Pârâul Boului, a tributary of the Briheni in Bihor County
 Pârâul Boului, the alternative name of Valea Boului (Buzău)

See also 
 Boul (disambiguation)
 Valea Boului (disambiguation)